Olaf O. Storaasli, Synective Labs VP, was a researcher at Oak Ridge National Laboratory (Computer Science and Mathematics Division's Future Technologies Group) and USEC following his NASA career. He led the hardware, software and applications teams' successful development of one of NASA's 1st parallel computers, the Finite element machine and developed rapid matrix equation algorithms tailored to high-performance computers (even harnessing FPGA accelerators) to solve science and engineering applications. He was PhD advisor and graduate instructor at UT, GWU and CNU and mentored 25 NHGS students. He is recognized by American Men and Women of Science, Marquis Who's Who, and NASA, Cray, Intel and Concordia College awards. NASA Awards include Viking Mars Lander design and Engineering Analysis (IPAD, RIM, HPC, FPGA, SPAR, FEM, Space Shuttle SRB and NASA Software-of-the-year).

Education

Storaasli received a B.A. in Physics, Mathematics & French (Concordia College, 1964), M.A. in Mathematics (USD,1966), Ph.D in Engineering Mechanics (NCSU, 1970) and post-doc fellowships: NTNU (1984–85), University of Edinburgh (2008).

Research
He develops, tests and documents parallel analysis software to speed matrix equation solution to simulate physical & biological behavior on advanced-computer architectures (e.g. NASA's GPS solver based on prior Finite element machine and rapid parallel analysis of Space Shuttle SRB redesign earned Cray's 1st GigaFLOP Performance Award at Supercomputing '89).

Books
 Engineering Applications on NASA's FPGA-based Hypercomputer, 7th MAPLD, Washington, D.C., Sept 2004.
 Large-Scale Analysis, Design and Intelligent Synthesis Environments, Elsevier Sciences, 2000.
 Large-Scale Analysis & Design on High-Performance Computers & Workstations, Elsevier Sciences, 1998.
 Large-Scale Structural Analysis for High-Performance Computers & Workstations, Pergamon Press 1994.
 Parallel Computational Methods for Large-Scale Structural Analysis & Design, Pergamon Press 1993.
 Parallel Methods on Large-Scale Structural Analysis & Physics Applications, Pergamon Press 1991.

References
1 Olaf Storaasli at the Mathematics Genealogy Project
2 State-of-the-Art in Heterogeneous Computing, Scientific Programming 18 pp. 1–33, IOS Press, 2010.(+PARA10)
3 High-Performance Mixed-Precision Linear Solver for FPGAs, IEEE Trans Computers 57/12, 1614–1623, 2008.
4 Accelerating Science Applications up to 100X with FPGAs, PARA08 Proc.Trondheim Norway, May 2008.
5 Computation Speed-up of Complex Durability Analysis of Large-Scale Composite Structures, AIAA 49th SDM Proc. 2008.
6 Accelerating Genome Sequencing 100-1000X MRSC Proc. Queen's University, Belfast, UK April 1–3, 2008.
7 Exploring Accelerating Science Applications with FPGAs, NCSA/RSSI Proc. Urbana, IL, July 20, 2007.
8 Performance Evaluation of FPGA-Based Biological Applications, Cray Users Group Proc. Seattle, May 2007.
9 Sparse Matrix-Vector Multiplication Design on FPGAs, IEEE 15th Symp on FCCM Proc., 349–352, 2007.
10 Computing at the Speed of Thought, Aerospace America pp. 35–38, Oct. 2004.
11 Preface: A Computational Scientist's Perspective on Appellate Technology, 15 J. App. Prac. & Process 39-46 2014.

External links
 Intel Supercomputing Pioneers (song)
 From Brunskill to Mars.
 NASA Lessons Learned.
 Web page.
 Google Scholar.

Living people
1943 births
American computer scientists
Oak Ridge National Laboratory people
History of Hampton, Virginia
American people of Norwegian descent